Rawhide is an American Western TV series which ran from January 9, 1959 until December 7, 1965, with a total of 217 episodes across eight seasons. It aired on CBS in black-and-white and starred Eric Fleming and Clint Eastwood.

Series overview

Episodes

Season 1 (1959)

Season 2 (1959–60)

Season 3 (1960–61)

Season 4 (1961–62)

Season 5 (1962–63)

Season 6 (1963–64)

Season 7 (1964–65)

Season 8 (1965)

Further reading 
 Greenland, David R. (2011). Rawhide: A History of Television's Longest Cattle Drive. Albany, GA: BearManor Media. .

External links
 

Lists of American Western (genre) television series episodes